The men's 200 metre breaststroke was a swimming event held as part of the swimming at the 1928 Summer Olympics programme. It was the fifth appearance of the event, which was established in 1908. The competition was held from Monday to Wednesday, 6 to 8 August 1928.

Twenty-one swimmers from 13 nations competed.

Records
These were the standing world and Olympic records (in minutes) prior to the 1928 Summer Olympics.

In the third heat Erich Rademacher set a new Olympic record with 2:52.0 minutes. In the fourth heat Yoshiyuki Tsuruta bettered the record to 2:50.0 minutes. Tsuruta improved the record in the semi-finals with 2:49.2 minutes and in the final with 2:48.8 minutes.

Results

Heats

Monday 6 August 1928: The fastest two in each heat and the fastest third-placed from across the heats advanced.

Heat 1

Heat 2

Heat 3

Heat 4

Semifinals

Tuesday 7 August 1928: The fastest three in each semi-final advanced.

Semifinal 1

Semifinal 2

Final

Wednesday 8 August 1928:

References

External links
Olympic Report
 

Swimming at the 1928 Summer Olympics
Men's events at the 1928 Summer Olympics